Floyd Lamonte Reifer (born 23 July 1972) is a Barbadian cricketer and politician. He is a left-handed middle-order batsman and a right-arm medium pace bowler. 

Reifer has played six Tests and eight One Day Internationals for the West Indies cricket team, spread over a home tour against Sri Lanka in 1997 and the 2009 edition of the ICC Champions trophy.  

Ten years after playing his fourth Test match, Reifer was recalled to play for the West Indies on 9 July 2009. He captained an understrength team fielded by the West Indies against Bangladesh. This 15-man squad included nine uncapped players and seven West Indies players made their Test debut in the 1st Test which was played at Kingstown, St Vincent on 9–13 July 2009. The first XI had made themselves unavailable due to a pay dispute with the West Indies Cricket Board. The West Indies went on to lose the two Test series 2–0 and the three match One Day International series 3–0.

In 2002 Reifer played as an overseas professional for Scottish club side Ferguslie.
He also played three matches for the Scottish Saltires as an overseas player in 2004. Of his 145 first-class matches, 85 have been for Barbados, with whom he has won six Carib Beer Cup titles.

Coaching career
Reifer was appointed head coach of the newly formed cricket team called Combined Campuses & Colleges in 2009. He played there as player-cum-coach. In April 2019, he was appointed as a head coach of West Indies national cricket team.

Politics
Reifer is active in Barbadian politics, and contested the 2020 St George North by-election as the candidate of the opposition Democratic Labour Party.

References

1972 births
Living people
Barbados cricketers
West Indies Test cricketers
West Indies One Day International cricketers
West Indies Twenty20 International cricketers
West Indies Test cricket captains
Combined Campuses and Colleges cricketers
Scotland cricketers
Cricketers at the 1998 Commonwealth Games
People from Christ Church, Barbados
People educated at The Lodge School, Barbados
Barbadian cricketers
Barbadian cricket coaches
Caribbean Premier League coaches
Commonwealth Games competitors for Barbados